Guan is a Guang is an ethnic group with several languages spoken in many parts of Ghana including the Gonjas, in northern in the Savannah region of Ghana, the Nchumurus in the northern, Oti and  Bono East Regions, the people of Larteh, the people of Winneba, Senya Beraku, Buem, Achode, Nkonya, Krachi, Santrokofi, Adele and Wuripong all in the Oti Region of Ghana. The Larteh is also called Anum-Boso

References

External links 
 
 Guan language dictionary

Guang languages
Languages of Ghana